Fort Duchesne  is a census-designated place (CDP) in Uintah County, Utah, United States. The population was 714 at the 2010 census, an increase from the 2000 figure of 621.

Fort Duchesne was originally a fort, established by the United States Army in 1886 and closed in 1912. The community developed around it within the Uintah and Ouray Reservation, established in 1864. Several bands of Ute were forced on to the reservation about 1880.

The headquarters of the Ute Indian Tribe are located here. Its reservation includes much of Uintah and nearby counties.

Geography
According to the United States Census Bureau, the CDP has a total area of 7.7 square miles (19.8 km2), of which 7.0 square miles (18.2 km2) is land and 0.6 square mile (1.7 km2) (8.36%) is water.

Demographics

As of the census of 2000, there were 621 people, 165 households, and 138 families residing in the CDP. The population density was 88.5 people per square mile (34.2/km2). There were 183 housing units at an average density of 26.1/sq mi (10.1/km2). The racial makeup of the CDP was 5.48% White, 90.18% Native American, 0.16% Asian, 0.16% from other races, and 4.03% from two or more races. Hispanic or Latino of any race were 5.15% of the population.

There were 165 households, out of which 46.1% had children under the age of 18 living with them, 30.3% were married couples living together, 43.0% had a female householder with no husband present, and 15.8% were non-families. 13.3% of all households were made up of individuals, and 1.2% had someone living alone who was 65 years of age or older. The average household size was 3.61 and the average family size was 3.78.

In the CDP, the population was spread out, with 40.1% under the age of 18, 11.4% from 18 to 24, 29.8% from 25 to 44, 14.7% from 45 to 64, and 4.0% who were 65 years of age or older. The median age was 24 years. For every 100 females, there were 95.9 males. For every 100 females age 18 and over, there were 82.4 males.

The median income for a household in the CDP was $18,750, and the median income for a family was $14,688. Males had a median income of $30,714 versus $20,750 for females. The per capita income for the CDP was $6,466. About 52.1% of families and 54.6% of the population were below the poverty line, including 57.4% of those under age 18 and 52.4% of those age 65 or over.

Climate

Notable residents
Danny Lopez, world champion professional boxer and member of the International Boxing Hall of Fame, Ernie Lopez's brother
Ernie Lopez, top ranked professional boxer, Danny Lopez's brother

See also

 List of census-designated places in Utah

References

External links

 Gary Lee Walker, research on Fort Duchesne, Utah, MSS 6856 at L. Tom Perry Special Collections, Brigham Young University

Census-designated places in Uintah County, Utah
Closed installations of the United States Army
Duchesne
Formerly Used Defense Sites in Utah
Populated places established in 1886
1886 establishments in Utah Territory
Census-designated places in Utah